Mohan railway station is a railway station in Mengla County, Xishuangbanna Dai Autonomous Prefecture, Yunnan, China. Opened on 3 December 2021, it is the southern terminus of the Yuxi–Mohan railway. The line continues south as the Boten–Vientiane railway.

The station has facilities for handling customs for international passenger and freight trains.

References

Railway stations in Yunnan
Railway stations in China opened in 2021